The rufous-tailed tyrant (Knipolegus poecilurus) is a species of bird in the family Tyrannidae.
It is found in Bolivia, Brazil, Colombia, Ecuador, Guyana, Peru, and Venezuela.
Its natural habitats are subtropical or tropical moist montane forests, subtropical or tropical high-altitude shrubland, and heavily degraded former forest.

References

rufous-tailed tyrant
Birds of the Northern Andes
Birds of Venezuela
rufous-tailed tyrant
rufous-tailed tyrant
Taxonomy articles created by Polbot